The 1961 Clemson Tigers football team was an American football team that represented Clemson University in the Atlantic Coast Conference (ACC) during the 1961 NCAA University Division football season. In its 22nd season under head coach Frank Howard, the team compiled a 5–5 record (3–3 against conference opponents), tied for third place in the ACC, and outscored opponents by a total of 199 to 126. The team played its home games at Memorial Stadium in Clemson, South Carolina.

Ron Andreo and Calvin West were the team captains. The team's statistical leaders included Jim Parker with 736 passing yards, Ron Scrudato with 341 rushing yards and 48 points scored (8 touchdowns), and Gary Barnes with 247 receiving yards.

Schedule

References

Clemson
Clemson Tigers football seasons
Clemson Tigers football